St Luke Catholic Learning Centre is a high school in Thornhill, Ontario, Canada. It is administered by the York Catholic District School Board.

See also
List of high schools in Ontario

References

York Catholic District School Board
High schools in the Regional Municipality of York
Educational institutions in Canada with year of establishment missing